2253 Espinette, provisional designation , is a stony asteroid and sizable Mars-crosser from the innermost regions of the asteroid belt, approximately 7 kilometers in diameter. Discovered by George Van Biesbroeck in 1932, the asteroid was named after the discoverer's residence "Espinette".

Discovery 

Espinette was discovered on 30 July 1932, by Belgian–American astronomer George Van Biesbroeck at the U.S. Yerkes Observatory, Wisconsin. The body was independently discovered on the following night by English-born South-African astronomer Cyril Jackson at Johannesburg, and by Soviet–Russian astronomer Grigory Neujmin at Simeiz Observatory on the Crimean peninsula, on August 4. No precoveries were taken. The asteroid's observation arc begins a few days after its official discovering observation.

Orbit and classification 

The asteroid orbits the Sun in the inner main-belt at a distance of 1.6–2.9 AU once every 3 years and 5 months (1,260 days). Its orbit has an eccentricity of 0.28 and an inclination of 4° with respect to the ecliptic.

Physical characteristics 

In the SMASS taxonomic scheme, Espinette is classified as a Sl-subtype, which transitions from the common S-type asteroids to the much redder L-type asteroids.

Rotation period 

Several rotational lightcurves of Espinette have been obtained. In April 2011, photometric observations by American astronomer Brian A. Skiff rendered a well-defined rotation period of  hours with a brightness variation of 0.25 magnitude.

Previous observations by Polish astronomer Wiesław Z. Wiśniewski in 1987, and by Italian Federico Manzini in 2005, rendered similar results.

Diameter and albedo 

The Collaborative Asteroid Lightcurve Link assumes a standard albedo for stony asteroids of 0.20 and derives a diameter of 7.0 kilometers.

Naming 

This minor planet was named "Espinette" after the discoverer's U.S. home in Williams Bay, Wisconsin, located near the discovering Yerkes Observatory. At their home, the Van Biesbroecks accommodated visitors of the observatory from all over the world. The name "Espinette" was proposed by the discoverer's children, and it refers to a coffeehouse in Belgium. The official naming citation was published by the Minor Planet Center on 1 June 1981.

Notes

References

External links 
 Asteroid Lightcurve Database (LCDB), query form (info )
 Dictionary of Minor Planet Names, Google books
 Asteroids and comets rotation curves, CdR – Observatoire de Genève, Raoul Behrend
 Discovery Circumstances: Numbered Minor Planets (1)-(5000) – Minor Planet Center
 
 

002253
Discoveries by George Van Biesbroeck
Named minor planets
002253
19320730